In Bruges is a 2008 black comedy-drama crime film directed and written by Martin McDonagh in his feature-length debut and starring Colin Farrell and Brendan Gleeson as two London-based Irish hitmen in hiding, with Ralph Fiennes as their boss. The film is set and was filmed in Bruges, Belgium. 

In Bruges was the opening night film of the 2008 Sundance Film Festival and opened in limited release in the United States on 8 February 2008.

For his performance in the film, Farrell won the Golden Globe Award for Best Actor – Motion Picture Musical or Comedy, while Gleeson was nominated in the same category. McDonagh won the BAFTA Award for Best Original Screenplay and was nominated for the Academy Award for Best Original Screenplay.

Plot

Carrying out orders, inexperienced hitman Ray shoots a priest during confession, but accidentally kills a young boy who is also in church. He and his mentor Ken are sent to Bruges by their employer Harry, where they are to await further instructions. Ken finds the city beautiful and relaxing, while Ray is bored and hates it.

They chance upon a film shoot involving a dwarf actor, which amuses Ray. Ray is attracted to Chloë, a local drug dealer moonlighting as a production assistant. He takes her to a restaurant, where he gets into an argument with a Canadian couple (mistaking them for Americans) and punches them. Chloë takes Ray to her apartment where they begin to have sex, but her ex-boyfriend Eirik appears and threatens Ray with a handgun. Ray disarms him and fires the gun, loaded with blanks, in Eirik's face, blinding him in one eye. Chloë admits that she and Eirik rob tourists, but insists she had told Eirik that Ray was not a target. Ray and Ken spend a debauched night with the dwarf actor, Jimmy, who takes cocaine and rants about a coming war between blacks and whites.

Harry calls Ken and orders him to kill Ray, on the principle that killing a child, even accidentally, is unforgivable. With a handgun supplied by Harry's local contact Yuri, Ken tracks Ray to a park and reluctantly prepares to kill him. Ray, however, distraught at his killing of the boy, prepares to kill himself with Eirik's loaded gun. Seeing this, Ken stops Ray, informs him of Harry's order and tells him to leave Bruges to have a fresh start. He gives Ray some money and puts him on a train to another city, while confiscating his gun to prevent a further suicide attempt. Ken reports the truth back to Harry, who immediately sets out for Bruges, furious at the insubordination. He picks up a gun at Yuri's, and Eirik, Yuri's son, learns of his intention.

On the train, Ray is identified by the Canadian couple he attacked in the restaurant and is escorted by the police back to Bruges. Chloë bails him out and the two share a drink on the market square beneath the Belfry of Bruges. Harry arrives in Bruges and rushes through the streets towards Ray's hotel, but spots Ken sitting outside a cafe. As the two have a drink, Harry boasts that if he himself had killed a child, he would have immediately taken his own life. Ken argues that Ray is trying to better himself and deserves a chance at redemption. Harry is sceptical, so Ken suggests they ascend the bell tower for a shootout away from witnesses. At the top, Harry pulls his handgun on Ken, but Ken refuses to retaliate. Confused, Harry cannot bring himself to kill Ken, so he shoots him in the leg as punishment for not killing Ray. Seeing Ray at the square, Eirik climbs the tower to inform Harry, who is helping Ken down the tower. Ken tries to disarm Harry, who shoots him in the neck and rushes down. Bleeding heavily, Ken drags himself back to the top of the tower and jumps into the square. Ray rushes to Ken's mangled body and learns of Harry's arrival. Just before he dies, Ken tells him to take his gun, but it has been broken in the fall.

Harry chases Ray to the hotel; Marie, the pregnant owner, refuses Harry entry, even when he draws his gun. To protect the owner and her unborn child, Harry and Ray agree to continue the chase on the canal and Ray, armed with Eirik's loaded gun, jumps on to a passing barge but drops the gun. Harry wounds Ray with a shot from a distance. Ray collapses on the street where Jimmy's film is shooting. Harry catches up and repeatedly shoots Ray. One of the bullets hits Jimmy (costumed as a schoolboy), blowing his head open. Mistakenly believing that he has killed a child, Harry, despite protest from Ray, kills himself. Ray is carried past Chloë, Marie and Eirik into an ambulance. In narration, Ray reflects on the nature of hell, speculating that it is an eternity in the city of Bruges, and declares that he really hopes he doesn't die.

Cast

Cultural references
The plot has similarities to Harold Pinter's 1957 one-act play The Dumb Waiter. The film also contains many references to the 1973 Nicolas Roeg film Don't Look Now, including the claim by Chloë that the film-within-a-film is almost an homage to it.  There is also a nod to film noir, a sequence from Orson Welles' 1958 Touch of Evil that is playing on the television set in Ken and Ray's hotel room.

The film contains many visual allusions to the work of Hieronymus Bosch, and at one point displays a Bosch painting of the Last Judgement.

Music

In Bruges: Original Motion Picture Soundtrack is a soundtrack to the film of the same name, released by Lakeshore Records and featuring the score of Carter Burwell as well as additional music found in the film. The soundtrack was released on 5 February 2008 in the United States and Canada.

Release
In Bruges was released in limited cinemas on 8 February 2008 and opened in 28 theatres in the United States.

Box office
The film opened at No. 25 in the United States with grossing $125,541 on its opening day and $459,575 on its opening weekend, ranking No. 25 with a per theatre average of $16,413. On its second weekend, it was released in 112 theatres and moved up to No. 22, grossing $970,211, with a per theatre average of $8,663. By its third weekend it moved up further still to No. 21 and made $738,318 from 163 theatres, with a $4,530 per-theatre average. It has a current worldwide total lifetime gross of $33,394,440.

Critical response
In Bruges received generally positive reviews from critics. Rotten Tomatoes gives the film a score of 84%, based on 210 reviews, with an average rating of 7.40/10. The website's critical consensus reads: "Featuring witty dialogue and deft performances, In Bruges is an effective mix of dark comedy and crime thriller elements." Metacritic gives the film an average score of 67 out of 100, based on 34 critics, which indicates "generally favorable reviews".

Chicago Sun-Times critic Roger Ebert gave the film four out of four stars, saying "This film debut by the theater writer and director Martin McDonagh is an endlessly surprising, very dark, human comedy, with a plot that cannot be foreseen but only relished." Tasha Robinson of The A.V. Club gave the film an "A−", praising the performances of the main cast: "Farrell, having successfully made the transition from overexposed-yet-underutilized action-thriller star to one-film-a-year artiste, gets a lot to work with, and he sells it all flawlessly, moving convincingly from offhanded, prickly asshole mode to nervous young lover to disintegrating martyr," and that "then again, all the leads are perfectly cast, and they help turn a light farce with thriller overtones into something deeper and sweeter." About the film itself, she added: "When it's funny, it's hilarious; when it's serious, it's powerful; and either way, it's an endless pleasant surprise." Claudia Puig of USA Today gave the film three and a half stars out of four and praised the two leads, stating that "Brendan Gleeson is brilliant as Ken … along with his partner in crime, Ray, played by Colin Farrell in probably his best performance." About the film, she added that it's "sharply written, superbly acted, funny and even occasionally touching." Damon Wise of Empire magazine gave the film four out of five stars, writing that "with In Bruges, the British gangster movie gets a Croydon facelift. It may not be new, but it's a wonderfully fresh take on a familiar genre: fucked-up, far-out and very, very funny."

John Anderson of The Washington Post gave the film a positive review, writing that "those who know McDonagh's work know a vein of darkness will run deeply through the comedy. It has seldom been darker. Or funnier. He has made a hit-man movie in which you don't know what will happen and can't wait to find out. Every movie should be so clichéd." Mick LaSalle of the San Francisco Chronicle also gave the film a positive review; he praised Farrell's performance, stating that "in the past few months, with Cassandra's Dream and now this, we've found out something about Farrell. He's not a matinee idol, and he's not a suave or heroic leading man. He's a terrific character actor, and he can go to low places that suave heroes can't risk, like anguish, self-hatred, embarrassment, utter confusion and buffoonery." About the film, he added that it's "witty and lively, with a soul to it, as well." Dana Stevens of Slate magazine also praised the performances of the two leads: "Farrell, who just played a remarkably similar tortured killer for hire in Woody Allen's Cassandra's Dream, finds just the right tone for this twitchy, funny, emotionally volatile thug; for once, he seems to know exactly what movie he's in. So does Brendan Gleeson, the big, shambling, sad-eyed Irish actor known to American audiences mainly for his role in the last two Harry Potter movies." She continued about the film: "A jolly mess of a movie. Overplotted, choppy, and contrived, it nonetheless has a curious vitality that makes you wonder where McDonagh will go next." James Berardinelli of ReelViews gave the film two-and-a-half stars out of four, writing that "the acting is top-notch. Colin Farrell, who seems to be gravitating increasingly toward smaller films, effectively channels his manic energy. He and Brendan Gleeson display chemistry in the Odd Couple vein, occasionally giving rise to instances of humor. Ralph Fiennes plays one of the most twisted roles of his career."

Lisa Schwarzbaum of Entertainment Weekly gave the film a "C+", indicating a mixed review; she praised McDonagh's directing, stating that "he's a specialist in constructing satisfying, live-wire dramas of violence that crash up against despair, in upending his characters' miseries with moments of twisted humor, and in sustaining a writing voice that roars with a particularly Irish robustness of obscenity." She also added that "neither star is sloppy, but both are loose and mellow—a couple of pros who know they're the whole show." Ella Taylor of Village Voice also gave the film a mixed review, stating that "Bruges may be the movie's rather too-long-running joke, but Farrell's shaggy brow is easily the most entertaining thing in Irish playwright Martin McDonagh's first foray into the crime caper."

Accolades

In Bruges was nominated for seven awards by the British Independent Film Awards, including the Douglas Hickox Award (Debut Director), Best Performance by an Actor in a British Independent Film and Best Screenplay, the latter of which it won. It was also nominated for two Satellite Awards: for Best Actor (Brendan Gleeson) and Best Film.

In November 2008, Martin McDonagh won the Irish Playwrights and Screenwriters Guild (IPSG) award for Best Film Script for the film. 

The film was also nominated for the Golden Globe Award for Best Motion Picture – Musical or Comedy, and both Brendan Gleeson and Colin Farrell were nominated for Best Actor – Motion Picture Musical or Comedy, which Farrell won at the 66th Golden Globe Awards ceremony, broadcast on 11 January 2009. McDonagh won the Best Original Screenplay award at the 62nd British Academy Film Awards in February 2009.

The film was nominated for the Best Original Screenplay award at the 81st Academy Awards in 2009, but lost to Milk. In the same year, it won the Best International Film award at the 6th Irish Film & Television Awards.

Home media
The film was released on DVD in Region 1 on 24 June 2008; region 2 on 11 August 2008; and Region 4 on 21 January 2009. It was also released on Blu-ray on 27 January 2009; and in region 1 on 13 July 2010. On 27 September 2022, Kino Lorber re-released the film in 4K Ultra HD.

References

External links

 
 
 
 
 

2008 films
2008 black comedy films
2008 crime thriller films
2008 directorial debut films
2008 independent films
2008 thriller drama films
2000s buddy comedy-drama films
2000s comedy thriller films
2000s crime comedy-drama films
2000s English-language films
Alliance Films films
American black comedy films
American comedy thriller films
American crime comedy-drama films
American crime thriller films
American independent films
American thriller drama films
BAFTA winners (films)
British black comedy films
British buddy comedy-drama films
British comedy thriller films
British crime comedy-drama films
British crime thriller films
British independent films
British thriller drama films
Film4 Productions films
Films about suicide
Films about atonement
Films directed by Martin McDonagh
Films featuring a Best Musical or Comedy Actor Golden Globe winning performance
Films produced by Graham Broadbent
Films scored by Carter Burwell
Films set in Bruges
Films set in Flanders
Films shot in Bruges
Films whose writer won the Best Original Screenplay BAFTA Award
Focus Features films
Icon Productions films
Scanbox Entertainment films
2000s American films
2000s British films